Frank McKee was a professional baseball player. He played part of one season in Major League Baseball for the 1884 Washington Nationals of the Union Association. He played in four games, spending time as an outfielder, third baseman and catcher.

External links

Major League Baseball outfielders
Major League Baseball third basemen
Baseball players from Pennsylvania
Washington Nationals (UA) players
19th-century baseball players